Regina Igorevna Dubovitskaya (born December 30, 1948, Shadrinsk, Kurgan Oblast, RSFSR, USSR) is a Soviet and Russian TV presenter. In the 1970s, she was associated with the radio program  Good Morning and in the 1980s, with the television program, Full House.

Biography
Regina Igorevna Dubovitskaya was born on December 31, 1948. in the city of Shadrinsk in the Kurgan Oblast in the family of Igor Dubovitsky and Nina Zhamkochyan.

Soon after the birth of his daughter, the Dubovitsky family moved to Chisinau. After the termination of the Reginal primary school, the family moved to Kostroma. After graduating from high school, on the edification of her parents, she entered the Pyatigorsk Institute of Foreign Languages, graduating with honors. in the specialty German language. Parents wanted Regina to relate life to science. However, after the institute was over, the German school was over.

In the late 1960s, she joined the letters department, which operated under the editorial office of the humor and satire of the All-Union Radio.
From the beginning of the 1970s editor of the radio program  Good Morning. Over the years of working on radio, Regina met with many humorists participating in this program, which in the future will participate in the sold-out. In the late 1980s, when glasnost was announced in the media, censors of old hardening still worked on the radio, which did not allow much air. Then Dubovitskaya decided to leave the radio and go to television.
On television, she creates the program  Full House, the task of which was to tell about the state of the stage of the colloquial genre at the end of the 1980s and about the place of variety in the life of the Soviet man.

Since 2000s, the program began to lose popularity in connection with the yearly growing competition. All new formats and faces are appearing, and  has recently ceased to develop and became the object of criticism. The transfer began to be criticized in the press for low quality and vulgarity.

The taxi driver failed to manage. Yelena Vorobey received a concussion, and Regina Dubovitskaya was in intensive care, with a fracture of the right hip. In the autumn of the same year Regina Dubovitskaya started filming new issues of  Anshlag.

Regina Dubovitskaya lives with her husband in a Moscow house near the Sheremetyevo International Airport.

References

External links
 Регина Дубовицкая мечтает о пластической операции 
 В гостях у Регины Дубовицкой

1948 births
Living people
People from Shadrinsk
Soviet television presenters
Russian television presenters
Soviet journalists
Russian television journalists
Russian radio personalities
Russian people of Armenian descent
Russian women comedians
Women television journalists
Russian women television presenters